Events from the year 1906 in art.

Events

 September–October – First group exhibition by Die Brücke, in Dresden.
 Gwen John begins modelling for Auguste Rodin.
 Hilma af Klint begins painting abstract art, including the first of her Primordial Chaos series.
 Paula Modersohn-Becker begins a series of nude portraits of herself and of other women and children in Paris.
 Juan Gris, Amedeo Modigliani and Gino Severini all arrive in Paris.
 Walter Sickert paints music hall scenes in London and Paris.
 Ferdinand Preiss opens his workshop in Berlin.
 Museum of Fine Arts (Budapest) completed.
  (third German arts and crafts exhibition) took place in Dresden from May 12 to October 31

Works

 Umberto Boccioni – Self-portrait
 Antoine Bourdelle – The Fruit (sculpture)
 Olga Boznańska – Portrait of a Lady in a White Hat
 Paul Cézanne – The Gardener Vallier
 Robert Delaunay – L'homme à la tulipe (Portrait de Jean Metzinger)
 André Derain
 Charing Cross Bridge, London
 The Pool of London
 Daniel Chester French and Edward Clark Potter
Equestrian statue of Charles Devens
Progress of the State (quadriga)
 J. W. Godward
 Drusilla
 Nerissa
 The Tambourine Girl (two versions)
 Wilhelm Hammershoi – Interior
William Le Baron Jenney and Charles Mulligan – Illinois Memorial
 Robert Henri - El Matador (Felix Asiego)
 Ishibashi Kazunori – Lady Reading Poetry
 Theo Alice Ruggles Kitson – The Hiker (statue)
 Peder Severin Krøyer – Midsummer Eve Bonfire on Skagen Beach

 Albert Marquet
 The Beach at Fécamp
 Fécamp (The Beach at Sainte-Adresse)
 Henri Matisse
 Le bonheur de vivre
 Self-Portrait in a Striped T-shirt
 The Young Sailor I
 The Young Sailor II
 Willard Metcalf – May Night
 Jean Metzinger
 Coucher de soleil no. 1
 Femme au Chapeau
 La danse (Bacchante)
 Portrait de Robert Delaunay
 Paula Modersohn-Becker – Self-portrait
 Claude Monet – Water Lilies
 Edvard Munch
 Portrait of Friedrich Nietzsche
 Self-portrait with a bottle
 Mikhail Nesterov
 Portrait of E. P. Nesterov
 Portrait of Olga Nesterova (Woman in a Riding Habit)
 Maxfield Parrish – Old King Cole and his Fiddlers Three (mural at St. Regis Hotel, New York City)
 Pablo Picasso
 Boy Leading a Horse
 Portrait of Gertrude Stein
 Self-Portrait with Palette
 Niko Pirosmani – Feast with Organ-Grinder Datiko Zemel
 Medardo Rosso – Ecce Puer (sculpted bust)
 John Singer Sargent – Self-portrait
 Zinaida Serebriakova – Country Girl
 Walter Sickert – La Hollandaise
 Franz von Stuck – Salome
 Albert Chevallier Tayler – Kent vs Lancashire at Canterbury
 Douglas Tilden – California Volunteers (sculpture, San Francisco)
 Ville Vallgren – Havis Amanda (bronze)

Births

January to June
 January 2 – Hans Mertens, German painter (died 1944)
 January 3 – Óscar Domínguez, Spanish surrealist painter (died 1957)
 January 9 – Janko Brašić, Serbian painter (died 1994)
 January 13 – Burgoyne Diller, American abstract painter (died 1965)
 February 28 – Percy Shakespeare, English painter (died 1943)
 March 2 – Jessie Oonark, Canadian Inuit artist (died 1985)
 March 8 – Victor Hasselblad, Swedish inventor and photographer (died 1978)
 March 9 – David Smith, American abstract expressionist sculptor (died 1965)
 March 26 – Henri Cadiou, French realist painter and lithographer (died 1989)
 March 27 – Bernard Lefebvre, French photographer (died 1992)
 April 11 – Dale Messick, first woman syndicated comic strip artist in the United States (died 2005)
 April 14 – Elmyr de Hory, Hungarian-born painter and art forger (d. 1976)
 April 21 – Lillian Browse, English art dealer and historian (died 2005)
 May 16 – Alfred Pellan, Canadian artist (died 1988)
 May 2 – Philippe Halsman, Latvian-born American portrait photographer (died 1979)
 May 20 – Leon Polk Smith, American painter (died 1996)
 June 9 – James Boswell, New Zealand painter and draughtsman (died 1971)

July to December
 July 8 – Philip Johnson, American architect, art collector, curator (died 2005)
 August 12 – Tedd Pierce, American animated cartoon writer, animator and artist (died 1972)
 August 14 – Horst P. Horst, German American photographer (died 1999)
 August 20 – Heinz Henghes, German sculptor (died 1975)
 August 21 – Friz Freleng, American animator, cartoonist, director and producer (died 1995)
 September 5 – Ralston Crawford, American painter, lithographer and photographer (died 1978)
 October 18 – James Brooks, American painter and muralist (died 1992)
 October 24 – Marie-Louise von Motesiczky, Austrian painter (died 1996)
 October 27 – Peter Blume, American painter (died 1992)
 November 26 – Krystyna Dąbrowska, Polish sculptor and painter (died 1944)
 December 10 – Padraig Marrinan, Irish painter (died 1975)
 December 14 – Maxwell Bates, Canadian architect and expressionist painter (died 1980)
 December 27 – Andreas Feininger, French-born American photographer (died 1999)

Deaths
 January 20 – Philippe Solari, French sculptor (born 1840)
 February – Charles-Auguste Lebourg, French sculptor (born 1829)
 February 14 – Carl Eneas Sjöstrand, Swedish sculptor (born 1828)
 March 5 – Hugh Ramsay, Australian painter (born 1877)
 March 17 – Thomas Dalziel, English engraver (born 1823)
 March 27 – Eugène Carrière, French Symbolist painter (born 1849)
 March 19 – Étienne Carjat, French portraitist (born 1828)
 March 29 – Slava Raskaj, Croatian watercolour painter (born 1877)
 April 5 – Wyke Bayliss, English painter (born 1835)
 April 14 – Walter Williams, English landscape painter (born 1834)
 April 19 – Daniel Huntington, American painter (born 1816)
 May – John Mulvany, Irish-born American painter (b. circa 1839)
 June 20 – John Clayton Adams, English landscape artist (born 1840)
 August 21 – Eugen Felix, Austrian painter (born 1836)
 August 29 – Alfred Stevens, Belgian painter (born 1828)
 October 2 – Raja Ravi Varma, Indian painter (born 1848)
 October 22 – Paul Cézanne, French painter (born 1839)
 October 28 – Jean Benner, French artist (born 1836)
 November 5 – Frits Thaulow, Norwegian Impressionist painter (born 1847)
 December 11 – Axel Lindahl, Swedish landscape photographer (born 1841)
 November 20 – Charles Eastlake, English architect and furniture designer (born 1836)
 December 31 – Julia Goodman, English portrait painter (born 1812)
 date unknown
 Antonio Beato, Italian-born photographer (born c.1825)
 Charles Edwin Fripp, English-born war artist (born 1854)
 Maeda Genzō, Japanese photographer (born 1831)

References

 
Years of the 20th century in art
1900s in art